RSC Anderlecht Féminin is a Belgian women's football team, currently playing at the Super League Vrouwenvoetbal. It formerly played the Belgian First Division and the BeNe League, that was folded in 2015. The team was founded in 1971 as Brussels Dames 71.

The team won one Belgian championship and four national cups as Brussels D71 between 1984 and 1991, and three championships and five cups as Anderlecht between 1994 and 2005, including doubles in 1987 and 1998, with the 1994-1999 lustrum being its most successful period. With ten titles Anderlecht is the Cup's most successful team. Since 2004 it has been the championship's runner-up in five occasions, most recently in 2011.

Twenty years after their last championship they again won the title in 2018. They followed that up with two more championships in the following seasons.

Titles

Official
 Super League (5)
 2018, 2019, 2020, 2021, 2022
 Belgian League (4)
 1987, 1995, 1997, 1998,
 Belgian Cup (11)
 1984, 1985, 1987, 1991, 1994, 1996, 1998, 1999, 2005, 2013, 2022
 Belgian Supercup (3)
 1995, 1996, 1997

Invitational
 Menton Tournament (4)
 1992, 1996, 1999, 2003

First team squad

Former players

Head coaches 
  Lucien Paulis (2009–2010)
  Gunther Bomon (2010–2011)
  Filip De Winne (2011–2016)
  Patrick Wachel (2016–2021)
  Johan Walem (2021–2022)
  Dave Mattheus (2022~)

Season to season

References

External links 
 

Anderlecht
Women
Association football clubs established in 1971
Sport in Brussels
Sport in Tubize
1971 establishments in Belgium
BeNe League teams